The 1944 edition of the Campeonato Carioca kicked off on July 1, 1944 and ended on October 29, 1944. It was organized by FMF (Federação Metropolitana de Futebol, or Metropolitan Football Federation). Ten teams participated. Flamengo won the title for the 10th time. no teams were relegated.

System
The tournament would be disputed in a double round-robin format, with the team with the most points winning the title.

Torneio Relâmpago

Torneio Municipal

Championship

Top Scores

References

Campeonato Carioca seasons
Carioca